This is a list of notable mammalogists, in alphabetical order by surname.

A-D
Roy Chapman Andrews (USA)
Vernon Bailey (USA)
Magdalena Bermejo (Republic of Congo/Spain)
William Thomas Blanford (UK)
Tim Clutton-Brock (UK)
Juliane Diller (Koepcke) (Germany)
Stephen D. Durrant (USA)

E-H
Tim Flannery (Australia)
Dian Fossey (USA)
Birutė Galdikas (Lithuania/Canada)
Bryan P. Glass (USA)
Edward Alphonso Goldman (USA)
Jane Goodall (UK)
John Edward Gray (UK)
Donald Griffin (USA)
Joseph Grinnell (USA)
Bernhard Grzimek (Germany)
David Harrison (UK)
Philip Hershkovitz (USA)
Hopi Hoekstra (USA)

I-L
Thomas C. Jerdon (UK)
Karl Koopman (USA)
Charles Krebs (Canada)
John Alden Loring (USA)
Marcus Ward Lyon Jr. (USA)
Richard Lydekker (UK)

M-P
David W. Macdonald (UK)
Martha Maxwell (USA)
C. Hart Merriam (USA)
Gerrit Smith Miller Jr.  (USA)
Cynthia Moss (USA)
James L. Patton (USA)
Oliver Payne Pearson  (USA)
Wilhelm Peters (Germany)
Reginald Innes Pocock (UK)

Q-T
Mazin Qumsiyeh (Palestine)
George Schaller (Germany)
David J. Schmidly (USA)
George Gaylord Simpson (USA)
Ian Stirling (Canada)
Oldfield Thomas (UK)

U-Z
Richard G. Van Gelder (USA)
Don E. Wilson (USA)

Mammal
LIst